Helen Island is an uninhabited island in Nunavut, Canada. It is located in the Kitikmeot Region's side of the Gulf of Boothia. It is situated west of the mainland's Simpson Peninsula, between Pelly Bay and Login Bay.

Islands of the Gulf of Boothia
Uninhabited islands of Kitikmeot Region